Forbidden Heaven is a 1935 American drama film directed by Reginald Barker and written by Sada Cowan and Jefferson Parker. The film stars Charles Farrell, Charlotte Henry, Beryl Mercer, Fred Walton, Eric Wilton and Phyllis Barry. The film was released on October 5, 1935, by Republic Pictures.

Plot

Cast
Charles Farrell as Mr. Archer / Nibs
Charlotte Henry as Ann
Beryl Mercer as Agnes
Fred Walton as Pluffy
Eric Wilton as Warren Radford
Phyllis Barry as Sybil Radford

References

External links
 

1935 films
American drama films
1935 drama films
Republic Pictures films
Films directed by Reginald Barker
American black-and-white films
1930s English-language films
1930s American films